Hornchurch was a borough constituency represented in the House of Commons of the Parliament of the United Kingdom. It elected one Member of Parliament (MP) by the first past the post system of election. At the 2010 general election parts formed the new seats of Hornchurch and Upminster; and Dagenham and Rainham.

Boundaries 
1945–1974: The Urban District of Hornchurch.

1974–1983: The London Borough of Havering wards of Elm Park, Hacton, Hylands, Rainham, St Andrew's, and South Hornchurch.

1983–2010: The London Borough of Havering wards of Airfield, Elm Park, Hacton, Hylands, Rainham, St Andrew's, and South Hornchurch.

The seat encompassed Hornchurch, Rainham, Elm Park and the village of Wennington. It bordered on the other London constituencies of Romford and Upminster and like them, was part of the London Borough of Havering.

History 

The south of the constituency has been seen as a site for building large entertainment centres on Rainham's large marshland area, and was viewed as a potential site for the European Disneyland project, although it was considered much less suitable than the current position near Paris. There have been plans to build a casino but permission is yet to be granted.

Hornchurch is a predominantly suburban and Conservative-voting area, but the seat is seen as a swing seat due to Rainham and Elm Park's working class voters and because the wealthiest Emerson Park area of Hornchurch does not form part of the constituency, instead forming part of Upminster constituency.

The Conservative Robin Squire was elected to Parliament as the member for Hornchurch on 3 May 1979, in one of the most surprising results of that election. Labour-held Hornchurch had not been a marginal seat and Squire had not expected to win it. However, he gained the seat from Alan Lee Williams with a majority of just 769 on a "freak" swing of 8.5% to his party. During the Thatcher years (1979 to 1990) Squire was considered to be a prominent "wet", opposed to the Conservative government's economic and employment policies. After Mrs Thatcher left office in 1990, Squire's political position strengthened and he held junior ministerial posts until the fall of the Major government in 1997. Squire was defending a majority of 9,165 – his personal popularity plus his prominence as a Minister led him to believe that he would hold the seat, but he lost to Labour's John Cryer with a 16% swing and a Labour majority of 5,680. Squire stood against Cryer again in the 2001 general election but was again defeated by a significant majority.

The constituency was abolished for the 2010 election. The areas of the constituency covered by the Elm Park, South Hornchurch, and Rainham and Wennington wards in the London Borough of Havering were merged with Dagenham to form a cross-borough Dagenham and Rainham constituency. Hacton and St Andrews wards in Hornchurch merged with Upminster to form Hornchurch and Upminster. Hylands ward in Hornchurch merged with Romford. Prior to the change in boundaries the new seats were predicted to be marginal Labour and safe Conservative respectively if they followed the voting patterns of the previous Dagenham, Upminster and Romford constituencies.

Members of Parliament

Elections

Elections in the 1940s

Elections in the 1950s

Elections in the 1960s

Elections in the 1970s 

Note: This constituency underwent boundary changes after the 1970 election, so was notionally a Labour seat.

Elections in the 1980s

Elections in the 1990s

Elections in the 2000s

See also 
 List of parliamentary constituencies in London

Notes

Politics of the London Borough of Havering
Constituencies of the Parliament of the United Kingdom established in 1945
Constituencies of the Parliament of the United Kingdom disestablished in 2010
Parliamentary constituencies in London (historic)
Hornchurch